John A. Hawkins (October 27, 1864 Meriden, New Haven County, Connecticut – February 22, 1941 The Bronx, New York City) was an American politician from New York.

Early life
Hawkins' family removed to New York City when John was still a child. He left school aged twelve years, worked as an office-boy in a law office for two years, and then became a printer. While working he attended evening grammar and high schools.

Career 
Hawkins was a member of the New York State Senate (21st D.) from 1903 to 1906, sitting in the 126th, 127th, 128th and 129th New York State Legislatures. He later served as Assistant Commissioner of Public Works in the Bronx.

Legacy 
He died on February 22, 1941, at his home at 441 East 136th Street in the Bronx.

Sources
 Official New York from Cleveland to Hughes by Charles Elliott Fitch (Hurd Publishing Co., New York and Buffalo, 1911, Vol. IV; pg. 365)
 The New York Red Book by Edgar L. Murlin (1903; pg. 82)
 TELLS MORE ABUSES IN CONDEMNING LAND in NYT on December 23, 1909
 JOHN A. HAWKINS DIES; EX-STATE SENATOR, 76 in NYT on February 23, 1941

1864 births
1941 deaths
Democratic Party New York (state) state senators
People from Meriden, Connecticut
Politicians from the Bronx